The Baer House is a historic house located at 1010 Rock Street in Little Rock, Arkansas.

Description and history 
It is a simple two-story L-shaped masonry structure, with a cross-gable roof configuration and a porch at the crook of the L. The front-facing gable has Craftsman-style brackets and half-timbering effects. The porch has a shed roof, and is supported by groups of short box columns set on tall brick piers, with a brick balustrade. The house was designed by the architect Charles L. Thompson, and was built about 1915.

The house was listed on the National Register of Historic Places on December 22, 1982.

See also
National Register of Historic Places listings in Little Rock, Arkansas

References

Houses on the National Register of Historic Places in Arkansas
Houses completed in 1915
Houses in Little Rock, Arkansas
National Register of Historic Places in Little Rock, Arkansas
Historic district contributing properties in Arkansas
American Craftsman architecture in Arkansas
1915 establishments in Arkansas